The Greatest Canadian is a 2004 television series consisting of 13 episodes produced by the Canadian Broadcasting Corporation (CBC) to determine who is considered to be the greatest Canadian of all time, according to those who watched and participated in the program.

The series two-hour debut on 17 October 2004 garnered more than one million viewers, with approximately 500,000 to 700,000 viewers per episode thereafter. The initial nomination phase received more than 10,000 names submitted for consideration. The second phase of the process concluded on 28 November at midnight and the following evening the winner from more than 1.2 million votes was revealed to be Tommy Douglas.

The series was inspired by the BBC production the Great Britons and has a spiritual sequel, The Greatest Canadian Invention.

Selection process  
The "Greatest Canadian" was chosen through a two-step voting process. The first phase beginning on 5 April 2004, involved the collection of data (nominees for consideration) through polls conducted by mail, phone and the internet. Of these nominees the bottom 40 of 50 individuals, in order of popularity, were revealed during the first episode in October.
 
The criteria for eligible as outlined by the CBC was broad:

To prevent bias during the second round of voting; the top ten nominees, also revealed during the first episode, were presented alphabetically rather than by order of first round popularity. This phase was accompanied by a series of hour-long feature documentaries, where 10 Canadian celebrities acting as advocates each presented their case for The Greatest Canadian. Viewers then submitted votes over the next six weeks supporting their favorite finalists. Importantly, there was no overall limit on the number of times any listener could call in and cast a vote, nor was voting restricted to Canadians.

Top 10
On 17 October 2004 the top 10 nominees were revealed at the end of the first episode in alphabetical order. The winner and all finalists were announced by popularity on 28 November and 29 in a three-hour two part series conclusion.

Top 50 
More than 10,000 names were submitted for consideration with the top 100 individuals being revealed online accompanied with a short biography. Of the 100 only the top 50 nominees were featured during the televised broadcast.

At least three* members of the nominees as the direct result of an active mass-mailing campaign among that individual's loyal and well-organized followers. Kin Canada founder Harold A. Rogers, DJ Hal Anderson, and Bahá'í activist Mary Maxwell all benefitted from a grassroots campaign to get their names included in the nominees list. CBC openly admitted this during the broadcast, recognizing that these three esoteric individuals are probably quite unknown to the general public.

Critics have complained there were only four women and three nonwhites in the top 50, that French Canadian participation was very low and that a large number of modern pop culture celebrities made the list like; Bret Hart, Mike Myers, John Candy, Jim Carrey and Avril Lavigne. Contemporary icons chosen may be reflective of a youthful voting demographic, as the production was family oriented, or there was unwillingness or confusion distinguishing modern popularity with national historic significance among the participants of all ages. In particular, Don Cherry's inclusion in the top 10 upset many Canadians, especially considering it forced out figures they believe more worthy like Louis Riel and Jean Vanier.

Other editions

Other countries have produced similar shows based on the format originated by the BBC. The Tomb of the Unknown Soldier and Alexander Graham Bell were also featured on the 100 Greatest Britons list. A two-hour spin-off series called  The Greatest Canadian Invention aired in 2007 with Insulin as the winner.

See also

Canada: A People's History
Canadian Newsmaker of the Year
Heritage Minutes
 List of Canadian awards
List of Canadian Victoria Cross recipients
List of Companions of the Order of Canada
List of inductees of Canada's Walk of Fame
Persons of National Historic Significance

References

2004 Canadian television series debuts
2004 Canadian television series endings
2000s Canadian documentary television series
Canada
Lists of Canadian people
Canadian television series based on British television series